A divizion (dywizjon) (a word in several European languages, mostly Slavic) is a military unit in some armed branches, usually artillery and cavalry, being an equivalent of battalion. It should be distinguished from division, which is a larger formation. The same word is used in some of these languages for a group of naval vessels (a division in naval usage).

Usage
 Russia / USSR: divizion (дивизион) is an artillery(also anti-aircraft and surface-to-air missile artillery) or cavalry battalion, and also a group of naval vessels. It was also used in relation to air force units and armoured train units. (An equivalent of a division is divizya (дивизия) in Russian.) 
 Poland: dywizjon is an artillery or cavalry battalion, including armoured cavalry, and also a group of naval vessels. It was also used in relation to air force units (e.g. "dywizjon 303" - "303 squadron" in RAF during WW II) and armoured train units. An equivalent of a division is dywizja in Polish.)
 Yugoslavia and successor countries: term divizion or дивизион (also spelled "divizijun") is used instead of battalion in artillery and anti-aircraft artillery branch but also for naval units of battalion, regiment or brigade size. Croatian Army at some point stopped using term "divizijun" in artillery and anti-aircraft artillery and the same term as in other branches is used instead ("bojna" i.e. "battalion"). Term "divizijun" is still used in Croatian Navy and has an equivalent of a non-commonwealth regiment. (An equivalent of English term "division" is divizija or дивизија in Serbo-Croatian.)
 Bulgaria: divizion (дивизион) is an artillery or rocket artillery battalion, and also a group of naval vessels. (An equivalent of a division is divizya (дивизия) in Bulgarian.)

Military units and formations by size